Jamie Robertson (born May 30, 1981) is an English film score composer.

Born in Essex, Robertson studied music from a very young age. With a theatrical background from just 10 he grew up knowing his love of music was to aim for film, TV and radio. Robertson's style includes the use of choirs, orchestral with a contemporary feel. His past work has included ambient soundtracks for both game and screen and orchestral sound tracks for film including Beneath the Mask: Portrait of an American Ninja.
In 2006 Robertson was a keen paranormal investigator and was asked to attend some filming for the TV series The Secret Life of Suburbia where he investigated a house in Dover claimed to have been haunted by a mysterious figure. The programme was produced by the company Shine TV.

Robertson has extensive music and sound design in Audio Drama including Doctor Who and the VETO NIX.

In 2007 Robertson began working with Big Finish Productions on the Official Doctor Who spin offs Dalek Empire 4. Starring Noel Clarke
2008 saw Robertson move onto mainstream Doctor Who audio with scoring the music to the Key 2 Time Series. Throughout 2008 and 2009 Robertson had over 18 CDs released on Different brands including Judge Dredd and Warhammer audios. In 2009 having already scored the theme tune to Highlander he went on to score the theme tune to the New Audio dramas of Sherlock Holmes Starring Roger Llewellyn and Nicholas Briggs. And this was followed in 2010 by scoring theme tunes for Graceless and the new official theme to the Stargate audios.

Filmography (as composer)

Filmography (as sound designer)

2009
 Doctor Who series 3 8th doctor extras (with Paul McGann and Lucie Miller)
 Doctor Who Wirrn Dawn (with Paul McGann and Sheridan Smith)
 Doctor Who Scape Goat (with Paul McGann and Sheridan Smith)
 Doctor Who Blue Forgotten Planet (with Colin Baker and India Fisher)
 Doctor Who: Lost Stories The Nightmare Fair (with Colin Baker and Nicola Byrant)
 Doctor Who: Companion Chronicles Bernice Summerfield and the Criminal Code (with Lisa Bowerman)
 Doctor Who: Companion Chronicles The Magicians Oath
 Doctor Who: Companion Chronicles Resistance
 Warhammer Raven's Flight (with Toby Longworth)
 Warhammer Thunder From Fenris (with Toby Longworth)
 Judge Dredd Stranger Than Truth (with Toby Longworth)
2005
 The Veto Nix: The Last Thousand Years -  Futuristic radio play  (with Robert Cambrinus)
2007
 Dalek Empire The Fearless: Part Two (with Noel Clarke Maureen O'Brien and Nicholas Briggs)
 Dalek Empire The Fearless: Part Three (with Noel Clarke Maureen O'Brien and Nicholas Briggs)
 Dalek Empire The Fearless: Part Four (with Noel Clarke Maureen O'Brien and Nicholas Briggs)

External links
 Official website
 

1981 births
Living people
English film score composers
English male film score composers
British sound designers